Now or Never is a 1921 American short comedy film starring Harold Lloyd and directed by Hal Roach and Fred C. Newmeyer.

Plot
A young woman, who is employed as a nanny to a lonesome child named Dolly, is preparing to take a vacation which will include a long-awaited reunion with her childhood sweetheart. Her employers are a busy couple who have no time for their small daughter, so the nanny decides—without seeking their permission—to take Dolly with her on her vacation.

Meanwhile, the young man she is to meet with races through the countryside by automobile on his way to his appointment. He crashes into a barn, loses his money to a tramp, and must complete his journey riding as a stowaway on the undercarriage of a train. After the couple meet, they and the child board a train. The woman has tickets for herself and Dolly, but the man has no ticket and no money.

The young woman discovers to her horror that her young charge's father is on the train. She does not want him to see her with Dolly, so she leaves the little girl with the young man and joins her employer in a separate coach. The young man is not an experienced babysitter, and caring for the child poses many challenges for him, especially as he must also evade the conductor.

The story ends happily: not only does Dolly's father approve of the young woman taking the little girl with her on her vacation, the young woman also discovers that her sweetheart is the man her employer was traveling to meet, as he has recently hired him for an important position.

Cast
 Harold Lloyd as The Boy
 Mildred Davis as The Girl 
Anna Mae Bilson as The Lonesome Little Child (Dolly)
 William Gillespie as The Child's Father (uncredited)
 Noah Young as Angry farmer  (uncredited)
 Roy Brooks as Chubby passenger (uncredited)
 Sammy Brooks as Short passenger (uncredited)
 Wallace Howe as Sheriff of Teetersburg (uncredited)
 Mark Jones as Passenger who throws shoe (uncredited)
 Gaylord Lloyd (uncredited)
 Earl Mohan as Drunk (uncredited)
 Charles Stevenson as Conductor (uncredited)

Preservation status
Prints of Now or Never exist in the collections of the UCLA Film and Television Archive and George Eastman House.

Production notes
Harold's car is a 1919 Mercer series 5 Raceabout.

See also
 Harold Lloyd filmography

References

External links

1921 films
1921 comedy films
American black-and-white films
American silent short films
Films directed by Hal Roach
Films directed by Fred C. Newmeyer
Rail transport films
Silent American comedy films
1921 short films
Surviving American silent films
American comedy short films
1920s American films